Interface Media Group, Inc. is a media agency providing audio, graphic design, video production and digital creative services in the Washington, D.C. area.

Founded in 1977, IMG's production facilities occupy approximately 40,000 square feet (3,700 m2) in downtown Washington D.C.,[1] and house the 50-plus staff of artists, editors, production management personnel and more.

Interface Media Group's work can be seen in documentary and entertainment programs that have aired on CNN, ESPN, HBO,[3] PBS,[4][5][6] the Discovery Networks,[7] TLC, and the National Geographic Channel.[8] In addition, they have worked with national and international organizations including Broadcast Television Networks; Cable networks; Advertising agencies; Political Campaigns;[9] Galleries and Museums;[10] State and Federal Government agencies; Independent Film makers; Corporations and Associations.

History 
Incorporated on February 7, 1977 as Interface Video Systems, Inc., by Tom Angell, the company opened its doors for business on May 2 of that year with three employees and one linear editing bay.    On March 1, 2007 the company was sold to longtime employee Jeff Weingarten and the name was officially changed to Interface Media Group, Inc.    The company now has 45 employees and 26 production and post production suites.

Throughout their 4-decade existence Interface Media Group (IMG) has collected numerous awards including Emmy Awards, ADDY Awards, Telly Awards, CINE Golden Eagles, TIVA Peer Awards, Davey Awards, Marcom Awards, W3 Awards, and more. In May 2017, DC Office of Cable, Television, Film, Music & Entertainment recognized IMG as the location of the Month. IMG were honored with distinction to celebrate their 40 years of media production service to the Washington DC area.

Notable Work 
Throughout its history in the industry, Interface Media Group has worked with numerous clients on various types of projects. Notable projects include:

Ted Turner’s “Avoiding Armageddon”

Interface Media Group was approached with the task of coordinating the post production and finishing of Philanthropist Ted Turner’s film “Avoiding Armageddon”. The eight-hour documentary series was created to raise awareness of the dangers of nuclear, biological and chemical weapons and the growing access to them. For this project, IMG created an integrated approach with the documentary’s production staff by setting up special offices for all 30 employees. Having all work done under one roof allowed the team to not only navigate changes to both the context and content, but also keep up with the tight schedule. In the end, the programming aired in the U.S. on PBS over four consecutive night in early spring 2003 as the war in Iraq raged and the effects of weapons of mass destruction were at its peak.

Comcast NBCUniversal’s "Voices of the Civil Rights Movement"

Comcast partnered with The Newseum to create an immersive experience for a collection of more than 200 civil rights era news clips. IMG created a custom interactive touch-screen kiosk where users could navigate these historical clips, some dating back to ‘60’s, using a range of factors (name, date, location of event, topic, etc.). The success of this project led to the UX/UI design being reprogrammed for an online version and the National Civil Rights Museum.

HBO’s K Street

Premiering in the fall of 2003, K Street was a weekly Sunday night docudrama on HBO that mixed fiction and reality on the famous corridor in Washington, DC. Produced by Steven Soderbergh and George Clooney, the series centered around members of a fictional lobbying and political consulting firm rubbing elbows with real politicians and lawmakers, wheeling and dealing, spinning and twisting, trying to skew national politics, policy, regulation and law to their paying client’s advantage. The challenge for IMG, one of the series’ production studios, was creating concepts each week based on real ongoing political news. Each unscripted episode began with weekly morning concept development then filming began with five synchronous hand held cameras. IMG set up an editorial suite on set, to immediately digitize and edit footage. After the around the clock editing was complete, it was off to IMG headquarters for color correction, audio mixing, film graining, audio playback and packaging. Each episode was mastered and quality controlled by the end of the work week and ready for its Sunday night debut.

Hillary’s Audio Book

In 2003, then New York Senator Hillary Rodham Clinton partnered with Simon & Schuster Audio to publish an audio book alongside the release of the hardcover book Living History. They chose Interface Media Group to record and produce this seven hour recording, marking the 3rd time IMG worked on an audio book for the former first lady. The previous books included “It Takes a Village” and “Dear Socks, Dear Buddy”

PBS Kids Channel

In 2017 PBS launched a new, nationally broadcast, children’s television channel to play PBS Kids programming 24 hours, 7 days a week. PBS Kids came to IMG to create teasers, promos, channel packaging and other branded content which totaled to over 220 elements for the roll out of the new station. With a task this large, every department from audio and editing, to design and animation, pitched in to complete the pieces on time. The 24/7 station premiered on 107 PBS stations, which covers 90% of the U.S. TV households, on April 21, 2017.

Intelsat Wall

Intelsat, a leading provider of global satellite communication services, wanted a media wall in their headquarters to showcase their impressive fleet of satellites. IMG embraced the challenge of designing content for the massive 24 monitor display. our design team created a 3D photo-real animation of Intelsat’s entire fleet as they orbit around a gleaming earth. Select satellites will expand periodically highlighting the launch date, model, and coverage area for each. IMG worked closely with the Intelsat team to not only reflect the important detail of the animation but also as a technical consultant for installation of the wall. Because of the success of the wall, IMG continues to create new products for Intelsat’s ever evolving brand.

Events DC – Experience

In 2016, IMG worked with Events DC to create a 360 video to showcase their venues and event that happen throughout the year. IMG capture footage from multiple Event DC properties including Stadium Armory, The Walter E. Washington Convention Center, and RFK Stadium. With the goal of immersing the viewer into an event, 360-video created an environment where users could look around freely throughout a scene, giving them the feeling of presence. Being one of the first management companies to utilize this technology allows Events DC a unique way to pitch their properties as the destination for hosting events.

Services 
IMG offers the following services: Motion Graphics; Animation; Visual Effects; Creative Editing; Web Design; Content Distribution; Audio Mixing; Sound Design; Original Music; Studio and Location; Live-Streaming and Webcasting; Digital Compositing for both HDTV and SDTV; Virtual Reality; and 360 Video.

Tools Used
Final Cut Pro; Autodesk Smoke, Flame, Maya; Digidesign Pro Tools; Avid; Adobe Systems After Effects, Photoshop.

References

External links 

IMDB Credits
 ICOM Article on Exhibits at NMAI
Museum Marketplace Listing
Goliath Listing
 Studio Monthly HotHouse Article
Autodesk Article
New Politics Institute Video

Film production companies of the United States
Television production companies of the United States
Video production companies
Mass media companies based in Washington, D.C.